Australia Zoo is a  zoo located in the Australian state of Queensland on the Sunshine Coast near Beerwah/Glass House Mountains. It is a member of the Zoo and Aquarium Association (ZAA), and is owned by Terri Irwin, the widow of Steve Irwin, whose wildlife documentary series The Crocodile Hunter and his family’s new show Crikey! It's the Irwins made the zoo a popular tourist attraction.

Australia Zoo was opened by Bob and Lyn Irwin on 3 June 1970 under the name Beerwah Reptile and Fauna Park. Their son Steve had helped his parents since childhood to care for crocodiles and reptiles and to maintain the growing number of animals in the zoo. In 1982 the park was renamed the Queensland Reptile and Fauna Park and the area was doubled with the purchase of another . Steve and Terri changed the name of their now growing wildlife park to Australia Zoo. As filming generated extra funds, Steve and Terri put all money raised from filming and merchandise into conservation and building new exhibits. Following Steve's accidental death from a stingray, Terri became the new owner of the zoo.

Australia Zoo won the Australian Tourism Awards for 2003–2004 in the category Major Tourist Attraction. In 2004, the Australian Animal Hospital was opened next to the zoo to help with animal care and rehabilitation. In 2010, Australia Zoo won Gold in the Queensland Tourism Awards for Major Tourist Attraction and in 2019, they won the RACQ People’s Choice Award – Experience & Services. Visitors will see a wide variety of birds, mammals, and reptiles, and can view crocodile feedings, and have hands-on animal encounters.

History

1970–1992
Australia Zoo was opened by Bob and Lyn Irwin on 3 June 1970 under the name Beerwah Reptile Park.  Bob is a world-renowned herpetologist, who is regarded as a pioneer in the keeping and breeding of reptiles, while Lyn was one of the first to care for and rehabilitate sick and injured wildlife in southeast Queensland. Bob and Lyn passed on their love and respect for wildlife to their three children: Joy, Steve, and Mandy. Steve had helped Bob and Lyn since childhood to care for crocodiles and reptiles and to maintain the growing number of animals in the zoo. In 1982, the park was renamed the Queensland Reptile and Fauna Park and the area was doubled with the purchase of another . In 1987, the Crocodile Environmental Park was opened in an effort to aid saltwater crocodile protection. By the 1990s the Crocodile Environmental Park had become very popular and was seen as unique for its display of crocodile feeding within the park. The area was mainly used to house adult saltwater crocodiles that had been captured and relocated from the wild.

1992–2006
The 1990s brought many changes: Bob and Lyn retired and moved to Rosedale, Queensland, while Steve and Terri changed the name of their now growing wildlife park to Australia Zoo. As filming generated extra funds, Steve and Terri put all money raised from filming and merchandise into conservation and building new exhibits. Their philosophy was that the zoo animals came first, the zoo team came second, and the zoo visitors came third. The zoo also expanded with the creation of a management team and hiring around 50 staff. Australia Zoo won the Australian Tourism Awards for 2003-2004 in the category Major Tourist Attraction. In 2004, the Australian Animal Hospital was opened next to the zoo to help with animal care and rehabilitation. The facility was built in an old avocado packing shed, and was dedicated to Lyn. The facility had a single operating room, and with a staff of 20 full-time workers and 80 volunteers, it cared for up to 6,000 animals per year. Steve Irwin died in 2006, the same year Australia Zoo Retail won the Tourism Retailing Award from Qantas Australian Tourism Awards.

2007–present
In 2007, the zoo and the Government of Queensland made a land deal involving giving a parcel of land from the Beerwah State Forest to Australia Zoo in return for land near Peachester State Forest which was transferred to the government for forestry. The swap permitted the development of an open-range safari attraction, allowing the zoo to expand to a world-class standard. In 2008, a new $5 million animal hospital, claimed to be the largest wildlife hospital in the world, opened next to the packing shed. The new  facility is built of mud brick and hay. It contains two operating theaters with viewing areas for student veterinarians, two treatment rooms, intensive care units for mammals, birds, and reptiles, a X-ray room, and public areas including a drop-off area, pharmacy, nursery, and waiting room. A conference room in the building will be rented out to help generate operating funds.

On 15 March 2008 the Brisbane-based newspaper, The Sunday Mail, claimed there are plans to sell Australia Zoo to Animal Planet and create a $100-million Disney-style wildlife theme park. Terri has publicly announced that she has no plans to sell the zoo, but is looking to expand the park. Despite rumours that she intended to return to the United States, Terri denied the claims and became an Australian citizen on 20 November 2009.

During the 2019–20 Australian bushfire season, the Wildlife Hospital associated with the zoo treated its 90,000th injured animal.

Management
The Australia Zoo business is owned by Australia Zoo Pty Ltd, but the land on which the zoo is located, and most of the surrounding area, is owned by Silverback Properties Pty Ltd.

Animals
Australia Zoo contains a wide range of birds, mammals and reptiles.

Birds

 Bar-shouldered dove
 Black-necked stork
 Blue-and-yellow macaw
 Brahminy kite
 Brolga
 Bush stone-curlew
 Chestnut-breasted mannikin
 Eastern whipbird
 Eclectus parrot
 Emu
 Galah
 Glossy ibis
 Gouldian finch
 Great cormorant
 Green-winged macaw
 Helmeted guineafowl
 Little pied cormorant
 Magpie goose
 Noisy pitta
 Pacific emerald dove
 Pied imperial pigeon
 Radjah shelduck
 Rainbow lorikeet
 Red-browed finch
 Red-collared lorikeet
 Red-tailed black cockatoo
 Rose-crowned fruit dove
 Sacred kingfisher
 Scarlet macaw
 Southern cassowary
 Sulphur-crested cockatoo
 Whistling kite
 White-headed pigeon
 Wonga pigeon
 Yellow-tailed black cockatoo

Frogs (Amphibians)
 Blue poison dart frog
 Dyeing poison dart frog
 White-lipped tree frog

Mammals

 Asian small-clawed otter
 Binturong
 Black-flanked rock wallaby
 Brush-tailed rock wallaby
 Cheetah
 Common wombat
 Dingo
 Eastern grey kangaroo
 Giraffe
 Koala
 Meerkat
 Plains zebra
 Red kangaroo
 Red panda
 Red-necked wallaby
 Ring-tailed lemur
 Short-beaked echidna
 Southern hairy-nosed wombat
 Southern white rhinoceros
 Sumatran elephant
 Sumatran tiger
 Swamp wallaby
 Tasmanian devil

Reptiles

 Aldabra giant tortoise
 American alligator
 Black-headed python
 Boyd's forest dragon
 Broad-shelled turtle
 Burmese python
 Coastal taipan
 Common blue-tongued skink
 Common death adder
 Corn snake
 Cunningham's skink
 Eastern brown snake
 Eastern diamondback rattlesnake
 Eastern shingleback
 Eastern water dragon
 Elongated tortoise
 Fijian crested iguana
 Freshwater crocodile
 Gila monster
 Green anaconda
 Indian star tortoise
 Inland bearded dragon
 Inland taipan
 King brown snake
 King cobra
 Komodo dragon
 Krefft's turtle
 Land mullet
 Mertens' water monitor
 Murray River turtle
 Radiated tortoise
 Red-bellied black snake
 Rhinoceros iguana
 Saltwater crocodile
 Saw-shelled turtle
 Scrub python
 Tiger snake
 Woma python
 Yakka skink

Exhibits

The Crocoseum

The 'Mount Franklin Crocoseum' stadium at the zoo has a seating capacity of 5,000. It is used mostly for animal shows. At the time of its construction, it was the first in the world where snake, bird and crocodile shows were conducted. Australia Zoo calls this the 'Australia Zoo Wildlife Warriors Show'. This is also where the zoo presents concerts, such as the Summer Down Under series.

Africa
On 17 September 2011, the zoo opened its African Safari exhibit, a multi-species replica of the Serengeti ecosystem, showcasing giraffes, plains zebra and southern white rhinos' interacting as they would in the wild.  Also on display are cheetahs, but not in the area where the other animals are. There is also an exhibit for meerkats next to the big savanna who share their exhibit with wandering helmeted guineafowls. This area of the zoo includes Queensland bottle trees reflecting the native African baobab tree and mock kopjes as seen in southern Africa.

Tiger Temple

Opened in April 2005, this exhibit houses Sumatran tigers (and previously also Bengal tigers). The exhibit was built to resemble the Angkor Wat temple in Cambodia. It is enclosed on two sides by glass, and includes an underwater viewing area.

Elephantasia
Elephantasia is a  Asian themed exhibit that opened in 2006 and is the largest elephant enclosure in Australia. It includes a wading pool with a fountain, and tropical gardens with shaded areas for the zoo's elephants. In October 2019 Australia Zoo imported four female Sumatran elephants. The elephants are on display in Elephantasia as of December 2021.

Rainforest Aviary
The Rainforest Aviary is an outdoor walk-through aviary housing about 150 birds, most of which are native to Australia. Adjacent to the Rainforest Aviary is the Birds of Prey aviary, which holds various species of raptors and other predatory birds. Following the birth of Bindi Irwin's daughter the Rainforest Aviary was renamed Grace's Bird Garden.

Bindi's Island

Opened beside the Africa exhibit in December 2014 and named after Steve's daughter, Bindi's Island is a three-story "treehouse" built around a replica fig tree. It offers panoramic views of Australia Zoo, including the adjacent lemur island.

Robert's Reptile House

The zoo's indoor reptile exhibits which showcase twenty different species of reptiles (and three species of frogs) in sixteen different terrariums.

Other Exhibits

Further exhibit zones include Crocodile Environmental Park, Roo Heaven, Wetlands and others.

Other facilities

Crikey! Cafe
Visitors can eat at the open air upper story "Crikey! Cafe" (which seats up to 1,500), at the Dingo Diner, or at several food vending stands around the zoo.

Transport
To get around the zoo, visitors can take Steve's Safari Shuttle, a 'modified trailered bus' that operates on a bitumen (asphalt) roadway circuit. Visitors can also hire a caddie with guide to drive around the zoo for the day.

Playgrounds
The zoo includes multiple shaded playgrounds as well as a jumping pillow and water splash park.

Activities
There are 4 walk-through enclosures that visitors can enter and feed kangaroos, wallabies, and koalas, and there is often an opportunity to pet a koala when staff are in the exhibit.

The zoo also offers a roving animal team that walks around the grounds throughout the day with various animals such as alligators, birds, snakes, and lizards. Visitors may have their photo taken with the animals and can purchase professional copies from the zoo's photo lab.

In April 2019 Australia Zoo announced $8 million project 'Camp Crocodile'. The wildlife camping experience is expected to lure over 39,000 visitors to the Sunshine Coast each year.

Animal rescue and rehabilitation

Wildlife Warriors

Wildlife Warriors runs a rescue operation and care station for any native wildlife which may be injured in accidents outside the zoo.

This effort is now supported by the  Australia Zoo Wildlife Hospital next to the zoo, which can care for up to 10,000 animals per year, with two operating theaters, two treatment rooms, intensive care units for mammals, birds, and reptiles, and an X-ray room, and was designed by WD Architects. The hospital is named in honor of Steve Irwin's mother Lynn Irwin, who died in a car accident in 2000.

Other zoo properties

Steve Irwin Wildlife Reserve

This  property was acquired with the assistance of the Australian government as part of the National Reserve System Programme. It is located on the Cape York Peninsula in Queensland, and contains spring fed wetlands that provide a water source to threatened habitat and the Wenlock River.

Iron Bark Station (Blackbutt)

Australia Zoo purchased the  Iron Bark Station located at Blackbutt, Queensland in 1994. It is part of the great dividing Range, where the East coast meets the dry West. An additional  was purchased in 1994 to save a dwindling koala population, with fewer than 12 koalas left in the area. Management immediately commenced reforestation, including 44,000 eucalypt trees for koalas. In 1998, another  was purchased. In 1999, a  release facility was established to rehabilitate native marsupials the area. Another  was purchased in 1999 with funds from the Lynn Irwin Memorial fund (now Wildlife Warriors Worldwide), and another  was added in 2002. In 2007, Bob Irwin became full-time manager of the station.

Mourachan (St. George)

This conservation area was developed to protect endangered species, such as the woma python and yakka skink. It consists of 117,174 acres, in which various habitat types have been created, by Australia Zoo and the Australia Zoo Wildlife Warriors.

It is a place where endangered species can reestablish populations, and as of 2015, Terri purchased an additional 33,000 acres of land to expand this conservation habitat.

See also

 Steve Irwin 
 Terri Irwin
 Bindi Irwin
 Robert Irwin
 Wildlife Warriors

References

External links 

 

1970 establishments in Australia
Zoos established in 1970
Zoos in Queensland
Tourist attractions on the Sunshine Coast, Queensland
Parks in Queensland
Buildings and structures on the Sunshine Coast, Queensland
Steve Irwin